Brownwood is a city in and the county seat of Brown County, Texas, United States. The population was 18,862 as of  the 2020 census. Brownwood is located in the Northern Texas Hill Country and is home to Howard Payne University, which was founded in 1889.

History

The original site of the Brown County seat of Brownwood was east of Pecan Bayou. A dispute arose over land and water rights, and the settlers were forced to find a new location. Greenleaf Fisk donated  to relocate the county seat to the west side of the bayou, on what is now the current site of Brownwood, and 100 additional acres for county use. The town was incorporated in 1884.

During the Second World War, Brownwood was the location of U.S. Army Camp Bowie, which had a peak complement of over 80,000 soldiers. Camp Bowie serves as a training camp today at the intersection Farm-to-Market Roads 45 and 2126.

On April 19, 1976, an F5 tornado struck near Brownwood, causing extensive damage, with 11 reported injuries, but no fatalities.

Brownwood's census figures were re-evaluated after the 2000 census from 18,813 to reflect more accurate figures of 20,407. The city was categorized in 2003 as a micropolitan statistical area. The federal Office of Management and Budget has issued a definition of micropolitan statistical areas as "an urban cluster of at least 10,000, but less than 50,000 population, plus adjacent territory that has a high degree of social and economic integration with the core, as measured by commuting ties."

A dispute over water rights created the adjacent city of Early. The two cities are separated by the Pecan Bayou, one of five major tributaries of the Colorado River of Texas.

Geography
Brownwood is located south of the center of Brown County, west of the Pecan Bayou. It is bordered to the east by the city of Early. Several U.S. Highways pass through the city. Routes 84 and 67 lead west towards Bangs and Santa Anna. U.S. Route 377 leads southwest towards Brady. All three highways head east into Early, where 67 and 377 continue northeast towards Comanche, while 84 leads southeast towards Goldthwaite. Just over the city line in Early, U.S. Route 183 leads north  to Cisco and Interstate 20, the closest Interstate highway.

Water bodies
The lake is a  reservoir created by damming the Pecan Bayou. A wide variety of fish occurs in the lake: largemouth bass, smallmouth bass, white bass, striped bass, white crappie, yellow and flathead catfish, sunfish (perch), and alligator gar. Camping, water skiing, jet skiing, and boating are available. It is home of Lake Brownwood State Park, a  area that opened in 1938.

Pecan Bayou is a major tributary of the Colorado River. Due to the damming of the area to form Lake Brownwood, the bayou has a shallow depth and little flow downstream from Brownwood. During heavy rains, the bayou often floods. It runs northwest to southeast and serves as a boundary between the cities of Brownwood and Early.

Demographics

2020 census

As of the 2020 United States census, there were 18,862 people, 7,167 households, and 4,367 families residing in the city.

2000 census
As of the census of 2000, 18,813 people, 7,110 households, and 4,664 families resided in the city. The population density was 1,493.2 people per square mile (576.5/km). The 8,169 housing units averaged 648.4 per square mile (250.3/km). The racial makeup of the city was 82.74% White, 5.51% African American, 0.61% Native American, 0.60% Asian, 8.47% from other races, and 2.07% from two or more races. Hispanics or Latinos of any race were 21.34% of the population.

Of the 7,110 households, 32.2% had children under the age of 18 living with them, 48.5% were married couples living together, 13.7% had a female householder with no husband present, and 34.4% were not families. About 30.1% of all households were made up of individuals, and 13.8% had someone living alone who was 65 years of age or older. The average household size was 2.46 and the average family size was 3.05.

In the city, the population was distributed as 27.5% under the age of 18, 12.8% from 18 to 24, 24.3% from 25 to 44, 19.2% from 45 to 64, and 16.2% who were 65 years of age or older. The median age was 33 years. For every 100 females, there were 90.6 males. For every 100 females age 18 and over, there were 84.1 males.

The median income for a household in the city was $27,325, and for a family was $33,991. Males had a median income of $29,090 versus $18,905 for females. The per capita income for the city was $14,158. About 18.2% of families and 21.4% of the population were below the poverty line, including 28.9% of those under age 18 and 12.8% of those age 65 or over.

Government and infrastructure
The Texas Juvenile Justice Department  operates the Ron Jackson State Juvenile Correctional Complex in Brownwood.

The Texas Department of Criminal Justice operates the Brownwood District Parole Office in the city.

The United States Postal Service operates the Brownwood Post Office.

Education

Brownwood High School has a strong tradition of nonsports UIL participation, including academic competitions and drama (one-act plays). Other opportunities for student participation include band, DECA, FFA, drill team (the Lionettes), Key Club, student council, Students Against Destructive Decisions, and National Honor Society.

The BHS mascot is the lion, with school colors of maroon and white. The school was tied for most state championships in high school football, with seven, the last coming in 1981, until Celina won their eighth state championship in 2007. Gordon Wood, who coached at Brownwood High for a quarter-century, retired in 1985 as one of the greatest coaches in Texas history, with 396 wins. He was recently surpassed by former Celina and Pilot Point coach G. A. Moore. Many athletes from surrounding communities move to Brownwood to play for the maroon and white.

Brownwood is home to Howard Payne University. The university's teams achieved national championship status in 1957 and 1964 in NAIA Cross Country, and in 2008 with NCAA Division III Women's Basketball. The Douglas MacArthur Academy of Freedom, a museum with recreations of famous rooms in American history, such as Independence Hall, and a  mural depicting Biblical history, is located on the Howard Payne campus.

Brownwood is also the home of a West Texas campus of the Texas State Technical College System. Computer-aided drafting and design, digital imaging and design, software and business accounting, associate degree nursing, chemical dependency counseling, health information technology, computer network systems and administration, computer science database and web programming technology, emergency medical technology (paramedics), mechatronics, and welding technology are some of the courses offered at the TSTC campus.

Transportation
Brownwood is served by the following highways: US 67, US 84, US 183, US 377, and Texas State Highway 279.  The Burlington Northern Santa Fe Railroad, Fort Worth and Western Railroad and Texas Rock Crusher Railway also serve the Brownwood area.

Brownwood is served by Brownwood Regional Airport.  The airport currently has two runways: 17/35, a 5599 × 150-ft (1707 × 46-m) asphalt runway (30,000 lb per wheel), and 13/31, a 4596 × 100-ft (1401 × 30-m) asphalt runway (25,000 lb per wheel).  Mostly cargo and private air operations take place at the airport, although in the past, Mesa Airlines offered regional connections.

Notable people

 Cofféy Anderson, American country singer-songwriter and internet personality, Attended Howard Payne, originally from Bangs, Texas
Candy Barr, stripper, burlesque dancer, actress
 Bob Denver, actor who played Gilligan on CBS's Gilligan's Island and Maynard G. Krebs on The Many Loves of Dobie Gillis, was raised in Brownwood and attended Brownwood High School
 Jerry Don Gleaton, Major League Baseball pitcher from 1979 to 1992 for the Texas Rangers, Seattle Mariners, Chicago White Sox, Kansas City Royals, Detroit Tigers, and Pittsburgh Pirates
 Graham Harrell, award-winning Texas Tech Red Raiders quarterback (2006–2008); born in Brownwood, grew up in Ennis near Dallas
 Tam Hollingshead, former Texas A&M football coach, former Odessa Permian head coach, defensive coordinator on the famous Friday Night Lights football team
 Shawn Hollingsworth, American football player
 Robert E. Howard, creator of Conan the Barbarian, attended Howard Payne and is buried in Greenleaf Memorial Cemetery in Brownwood
 Case Keenum, NFL quarterback
 Joe M. Kilgore, former U.S. representative from Texas, born in Brownwood in 1918
 Matthew McCrane, kicker 
 Shelby Miller, pitcher for the Texas Rangers, formerly of the Atlanta Braves and Arizona Diamondbacks; led the 2009 Brownwood High School baseball team to the regional finals
 Jim Morris, pitcher and coach, started a brief professional baseball career at the age of 35; the 2002 film The Rookie, starring Dennis Quaid, is based on Morris' life; born in Brownwood
 Casey Pachall, quarterback for Texas Christian University
 Paul & Paula, or Ray Hildebrand and Jill Jackson, singers, attended Howard Payne University in 1962; their song "Hey Paula" was presented on a local radio station as part of an American Cancer Society benefit
 Josh Rosenthal, singer-songwriter born in Brownwood
 J. L. Hunter "Red" Rountree, the oldest bank robber in history, who in 2003 robbed a bank at the age of 91
 George M. Shelton, Medal of Honor recipient
 John Paul Stapp, United States Air Force colonel, pioneer in studying effects of acceleration and deceleration forces on humans; preliminary education at Brownwood High School and San Marcos Academy in San Marcos
 Glenn Strange, who played Sam the Bartender on CBS's Gunsmoke from 1961 until his death in 1973, grew up in Brown County near Cross Cut; also played Frankenstein's Monster in final three Universal Studios Frankenstein films of 1940s
 Madylin, Sullivan, and Sawyer Sweeten played the Barone children on the television sitcom Everybody Loves Raymond
 Jack Taylor, mayor of Mesa, Arizona, from 1966 to 1972, resided in Brownwood
 Jim Thomason, football halfback and member of 1939 national championship team of Texas A&M University, selected fifth overall by Detroit Lions in 1941 NFL draft
 Kenny Vaccaro, former NFL safety who played from 2013 to 2020 for the New Orleans Saints and the Tennessee Titans.
 Clint Walker, star of the 1955–1963 Western television series Cheyenne on ABC and films including The Dirty Dozen, lived briefly in Brownwood prior to launching his acting career
 Walt Williams, Major League Baseball player from 1964 to 1975
 Drew Womack, country music singer-songwriter, had a 1997 Top 10 hit with the band Sons of the Desert, "Whatever Comes First"
 Gordon Wood set a state and national record with a total of 396 wins, 91 losses, and 15 ties in 43 seasons as a head Texas high school football coach, an 80% winning record; won seven state championships at Brownwood; inducted into the Texas Sports Hall of Fame
 Bob Young, football offensive guard who played 16 seasons in NFL; competed in inaugural World's Strongest Man contest in 1977, finishing second to weightlifter Bruce Wilhelm
 Doug Young, three-time world champion powerlifter (1975, 1976 and 1977), viewed by some as the greatest-ever exponent of the sport in the days before modern-equipped lifting

Climate
The climate in this area is characterized by hot, humid summers and generally mild to cool winters.  According to the Köppen climate classification, Brownwood has a humid subtropical climate, Cfa on climate maps.

References

External links

 City website

Cities in Texas
Cities in Brown County, Texas
County seats in Texas
Micropolitan areas of Texas